Bárbara Reyzábal González-Aller (born 29 March 1982), known professionally as Barei, is a Spanish singer and songwriter. She represented Spain in the Eurovision Song Contest 2016 with the song "Say Yay!".

Biography

Early life
Bárbara Reyzábal González-Aller was born March 29, 1982 in Madrid. She is the daughter of Teresa González-Aller Monterde and Fortunato Reyzábal Larrouy. Her father, who died shortly after she was born, belonged to the Reyzábal family, a family that was dedicated to production of films, investments in real estate properties, and the operation of party venues in Madrid. She has three siblings: Ignacio Jesús, Julián, and Lourdes. Bárbara studied singing, guitar, musical language, and piano.

Career beginnings
Bárbara began her career at 16 recording covers to songs by Christina Aguilera, Laura Pausini or Lara Fabian. In 2001, she participated in the Benidorm International Song Festival together with Gonzalo Nuche as part of a duo known as Dos Puntos with the song "Abrazo del tiempo". They got the second place. Shortly after the festival, Bárbara moved to Miami, where she recorded demos in the Latin pop genre that she decided to keep unpublished. Back in Madrid, she became a regular performer in the city's concert halls.

2011–2014: Billete para no volver, and standalone singles
In 2011, Bárbara, adopting the stage name Barei, published her first studio album, Billete para no volver, an album fully in Spanish language produced by Rubén Villanueva. After this album, Barei began to publish standalone singles in English language every few months, beginning with "Play" in October 2012. Some of the following singles, like "Foolish NaNa" (2013), obtained success. The video of "Another's Life" (2013) got 600,000 views in YouTube, while the video of "Wildest Horses" (2014) got 1.5 million views.

2014–2016: Throw the Dice
Barei's second album Throw the Dice, released on 7 April 2015, was strongly influenced by British and American pop, funk and soul and included some of the singles she had released the previous two years like "Foolish NaNa", "Another's Life" and "Wildest Horses". In July 2015, Barei served as the warm-up act for Lenny Kravitz at the Starlite Festival in Marbella.

In September 2015, Barei released "Time to Fight", a song she wrote together with Fernando Montesinos that served as the theme song for Atresmedia's coverage of the 2015–16 UEFA Champions League.

As a songwriter for other artists, in 2015, Barei co-wrote the song "La última superviviente" for Edurne, a track included in Edurne's sixth studio album Adrenalina, as well as the song "Encadenada a ti" for Malú, a track included in Malú's tenth studio album Caos and its second single.

2016: Eurovision Song Contest 2016
On 29 December 2015, the Spanish broadcaster Radiotelevisión Española (RTVE), announced Barei as one of the six candidates in the Spanish national selection, Objetivo Eurovisión, for the Eurovision Song Contest 2016. On 19 January 2016, samples of the six songs were released by RTVE, with Barei singing "Say Yay!" written by herself, Rubén Villanueva, and Víctor Púa Vivó. On 1 February, Barei won the Spanish national selection with 114 points, and represented Spain in the Eurovision Song Contest 2016 held in Stockholm, Sweden in May. In the final she placed 22nd.

Following her win on Objetivo Eurovisión, Barei was signed to Universal Music Spain. On 22 April 2016, a re-issue of her 2015 album Throw the Dice was released, including three new tracks: "Say Yay!" and previously unpublished songs "Who Plays the Drums" and "Super Ranger".

2017–present: After Eurovision
On 3 March 2017, after ending her relationship with Universal Music, Barei released the standalone single "I Don't Need to Be You", a song against bullying. An accompanying music video being released on 3 March 2017 went on to successfully gain over 1.4 million views on YouTube.

Barei released three new singles on three consecutive weeks on 23 June, 30 June and 7 July 2017, "Wasn't Me", "Forget It" and "Worry, Worry" respectively, the latter a collaboration with rapper Porta. The former single preceded and was included on Barei's third studio album, You Number One, released on 4 May 2014. The same-titled single was released on 20 April 2018.

Personal life
Reyzábal gave birth to a girl and a boy, named India and León respectively, on 26 December 2018.

Discography

Studio albums

Singles

As lead artist

As featured artist

References

External links

1982 births
Eurovision Song Contest entrants of 2016
Living people
Singers from Madrid
Eurovision Song Contest entrants for Spain
Edurne
Spanish songwriters
English-language singers from Spain
21st-century Spanish singers
21st-century Spanish women singers